Calcinosis is the formation of calcium deposits in any soft tissue. It is a rare condition that has many different causes. These range from infection and injury to systemic diseases like kidney failure.

Types

Dystrophic calcification
The most common type of calcinosis is dystrophic calcification. This type of calcification can occur as a response to any soft tissue damage, including that involved in implantation of medical devices.

Metastatic calcification
Metastatic calcification involves a systemic calcium excess imbalance, which can be caused by hypercalcemia, kidney failure, milk-alkali syndrome, lack or excess of other minerals, or other causes.

Tumoral calcinosis
The cause of the rare condition of tumoral calcinosis is not entirely understood. It is generally characterized by large, globular calcifications near joints.

See also
 Calcification
 Calcinosis cutis
 Dermatomyositis
 Fahr's syndrome
 Hyperphosphatemia
 Primrose syndrome
 Scleroderma

References

External links 
 

Symptoms and signs
Medical terminology
Calcium